Steven McDermott (born 30 December 1964) is an English former footballer who played as a forward in the Football League for Darlington. He was an apprentice with Sunderland, and also played non-league football for Esh Winning. McDermott joined Darlington in November 1982, and made two substitute appearances for the club, both 2–0 defeats in the Fourth Division, on 4 December 1982 at home to Wimbledon and in their next match, away to Hartlepools United.

References

1964 births
Living people
Footballers from Gateshead
English footballers
Association football forwards
Sunderland A.F.C. players
Darlington F.C. players
Esh Winning F.C. players
English Football League players